Su Lingdan (born 12 January 1997) is a Chinese athlete specialising in the javelin throw. She represented her country at the 2019 World Championships without qualifying for the final.

Her personal best in the event is 62.66 metres set in Chengdu in 2019.

International competitions

References

1997 births
Living people
Chinese female javelin throwers
World Athletics Championships athletes for China
Competitors at the 2017 Summer Universiade
Competitors at the 2019 Summer Universiade
21st-century Chinese women